Abdul Awal may refer to:
 Abdul Awal (Pakistani politician), member of the National Assembly of Pakistan for East Pakistan
 Abdul Awal (Comilla politician), Bangladeshi Awami League politician
 Abdul Awal (Rangpur politician), Bangladeshi Awami League politician